Gobarralong is a rural community in the central east part of the Riverina. It is situated about 16 kilometres southeast of Coolac and 27 kilometres northwest of Adjungbilly.

North Gobarralong Post Office opened on 1 November 1876, was renamed Gobarralong in 1909, and closed in 1967.

Notes and references

Towns in the Riverina
Towns in New South Wales